Taeniotes luciani is a species of beetle in the family Cerambycidae. It was described by James Thomson in 1859. It is known from Colombia, Mexico, Honduras, Belize, Guatemala, Costa Rica and Panama.

References

luciani
Beetles described in 1859
Beetles of Central America